Sapphire Rapids is a codename for Intel's server (fourth generation Xeon Scalable) and workstation processors based on Intel 7.

Sapphire Rapids is part of the Eagle Stream server platform. In addition, it will be powering Aurora, an exascale supercomputer in the United States, at Argonne National Laboratory.

History 
Sapphire Rapids has been a long-standing Intel project in development for over five years and has been subjected to many delays. Sapphire Rapids was first announced by Intel at their Investor Meeting in May 2019 with the intention of Sapphire Rapids succeeding Ice Lake in 2021. Intel again announced details on Sapphire Rapids in their August 2021 Architecture Day presentation with no mention of a launch date. Intel CEO Pat Gelsinger tacitly blamed the previous Intel leadership as a reason for Sapphire Rapid's many delays. One industry analyst firm claimed that Intel was having problems with yields from its Intel 7 node with yields of 50–60% on higher core-count silicon. Sapphire Rapids was originally scheduled for a launch in the first half of 2022. It was later scheduled for release in Q4 2022 but was again delayed to early 2023. The specific announcement date of January 10, 2023 was not revealed by Intel until November 2022. The workstation processor lineup was released on February 15, 2023.  Nevine Nassif is a chief engineer for this generation.  Those processors were available for shipping on March 14 of that year.

Features

CPU 

 Up to 60 Golden Cove CPU cores per package
 AVX512-FP16
 TSXLDTRK
 Advanced Matrix Extensions (AMX)
 In-Field Scan (IFS), a technology that allows for testing the processor for potential hardware faults without taking it completely offline
 Data Streaming Accelerator (DSA), allows for speeding up data copy and transformation between different kinds of storage
 QuickAssist Technology (QAT), allows for improved performance of compression and encryption tasks
 Dynamic Load Balancer (DLB), allows for offloading tasks of load balancing, packet prioritization and queue management
 In-Memory Analytics Accelerator (IAA), allows accelerating in-memory databases and big data analytics

Not all accelerators are available in all processor models. Some accelerators are available under the Intel On Demand program, also known as Software Defined Silicon (SDSi), where a license is required to activate a given accelerator that is physically present in the processor. The license can be obtained as a one-time purchase or as a paid subscription. Activating the license requires support in the operating system. A driver with the necessary support was added in Linux 6.2.

I/O 
 PCI Express 5.0
 DDR5 memory support up to DDR5-4800
 On-package HBM2e Memory as L4 cache on some models
 Compute Express Link 1.1

XCC multi-die configuration 
 Multi-die chip with four tiles linked by 2.5D Embedded Multi-die Interconnect Bridges. Each tile is a 400mm2 SoC, providing both compute cores and I/O.
 Each tile contains 15 Golden Cove cores
 Each tile's memory controller provides two channels of DDR5 with a maximum of eight channels across 4 tiles
 A tile provides up to 32 PCIe 5.0 lanes, but one of the eight PCIe controllers of a CPU is usually reserved for DMI, resulting in a maximum of 112 non-chipset lanes. This maximum is only reached in the W-3400 series processors, while the server processors have 80.
 Xeon Max processors also contain 64 GB of High Bandwidth Memory

Products

Sapphire Rapids-SP (Server) 
With its maximum of 60 cores, Sapphire Rapids-SP competes with AMD's EPYC Genoa with up to 96 cores. Sapphire Rapids Xeon server products are scalable from single-socket configurations up to 8 socket configurations.

Xeon Bronze and Silver

Xeon Gold

Xeon Platinum

Xeon Max Series

Sapphire Rapids-WS (Workstation) 
With its maximum of 56 cores, Sapphire Rapids-WS competes with AMD's Threadripper Pro 5000WX with up to 64 cores. Like Intel's Core product segmentation into i3, i5, i7 and i9, Sapphire Rapids-WS is labeled Xeon w3, w5, w7 and w9. Sapphire Rapids-WS was unveiled in February 2023, and will be initially available for OEMs in March. CPUs with "X" suffix have its multiplier unlocked for overclocking.

 CPU models ending with X are overclockable, others are not.

See also 
 Intel's process–architecture–optimization model
 Intel's tick–tock model
 List of Intel CPU microarchitectures

References 

Intel products
Intel microprocessors